Northside or North Side may refer to:

Music
 Northside (band), a musical group from Manchester, England
 NorthSide, an American record label
 NorthSide Festival (Denmark), a music festival in Aarhus, Denmark
 "Norf Norf", a 2015 song by Vince Staples

Places

Canada
 Northside, Saskatchewan
 Northside East Bay, Nova Scotia
 North Side, Newfoundland and Labrador

United States
 North Side, California, former name of Oildale, California
 Northside, Berkeley, California
 Northside, Long Beach, California
 North East Side (Denver), a region in both Denver County and Adams County, Colorado
 North West Side (Denver), a region in Denver County, Colorado
 North Side, Chicago, Illinois
 Northside (East Chicago), Illinois
 Northside (Jacksonville), a region in Jacksonville, Florida
 Northside, Lexington, a neighborhood in northern Lexington, Kentucky
 Northside, Paterson, a neighborhood in Paterson New Jersey
 North Side, Binghamton, a neighborhood of Binghamton, New York
 Northside, Syracuse, New York
 Northside, Cincinnati, Ohio
 North Side (Pittsburgh), Pennsylvania
 North Side, Waco, Texas, a neighborhood of Waco, Texas
 Northside, Houston, a district of Houston, Texas
 North Side, U.S. Virgin Islands, a settlement on the island of Saint Croix
 Northside, Saint Thomas, U.S. Virgin Islands, an administrative census subdistrict on Saint Thomas
 North Side (Richmond, Virginia)

Other places
 North Side, Anguilla, a district in Anguilla
 North Side, Cayman Islands
 Northside, a district of the town of Workington, England
 Northside, Dublin, Ireland

Schools
 Northside Christian School (North Charleston, SC), United States
 Northside High School (disambiguation)
 Northside Middle School (disambiguation)
Northside High School (Columbus, GA), United States

Other uses
 North Side Inc, software company
 North Side SC, a football club in George Town, Cayman Islands
 Northside (Metrorail station), Miami, Florida

See also
 
 Near North Side (disambiguation)
 North Side Historic District (disambiguation)
 North Side station (disambiguation)
 Northside Historic District (disambiguation)